Homeobox protein OTX2 is a protein that in humans is encoded by the OTX2 gene.

Function 

This gene encodes a member of the bicoid sub-family of homeodomain-containing transcription factors. The encoded protein acts as a transcription factor and play a role in brain and sensory organ development. A similar protein in mice is required for proper forebrain development. Two transcript variants encoding distinct isoforms have been identified for this gene. Other alternative splice variants may exist, but their full length sequences have not been determined.

Otx2 is a group of homeobox genes that are typically described as a head organizer in the primitive streak stage of embryonic development. Otx2, which is an encoded protein that plays the role of a transcription factor, has also been shown to be involved in the regional patterning of the midbrain and forebrain. This group of genes demonstrates later in progression to have an influence on the formation of the sensory organs, pituitary gland, pineal gland, inner ear, eye and optic nerve. Otx2 not only has a prominent role in developing this area but also aids in ensuring that the retina and brain stay intact. This group of genes has a huge role in development and if it is expressed incorrectly it can have detrimental effects on the fetus. Otx2 mutations have also been associated with seizures, developmental delays, short stature, structural abnormalities of the pituitary gland, and an early onset of degeneration of the retina. A “knockout” model on the group of Otx2 genes has been performed to see what effects it would have on the adult retina. It was found that without the Otx2 gene expression there was slow degeneration of photoreceptor cells in this area. Thus, proving that the homeobox genes of Otx2 are essential in forming a viable embryo.

Otx-2 is necessary for retina development, retina maturation, and fate determination of photoreceptors. In the mouse, studies have shown development of the retina is regulated in a cell type- and stage-specific manner by seven Otx2 cis-regulatory modules. Three of these cis-regulatory modules, O5, O7 and O9 indicate three distinct cellular expressions of Otx2.  A “knockin” mouse line was generated where Crx (Otx family homeoprotein) was replaced by Otx2 and vice versa to examine the functional substitutability.  It was found that Crx and Otx2 cannot be substituted in photoreceptor development. High Otx2 levels induce photoreceptor cell fate but not bipolar cell fate. Low levels of Otx2 impair bipolar cell maturation and survival. 
Studies in the chicken confirmed a functional role for Otx2 in the determination of photoreceptors. Otx2 also represses specific retinal fates (such as subtypes of retinal ganglion and horizontal cells) of sister cells to promote the specification of photoreceptors.

Clinical significance 

Otx2 is expressed in the brain, ear, nose and eye, and in the case of mutations; it can lead to significant developmental abnormalities and disorders. Mutations in OTX2 can cause eye disorders including anophthalmia and microphthalmia. Apart from anophthalmia and microphthalmia, other abnormalities such as aplasia of the optic nerve, hypoplasia of the optic chiasm and dysplastic optic globes have also been observed. Other defects that occur due to a mutation of the Otx2 gene include pituitary abnormalities and mental retardation. Abnormal pituitary structure and/or function seem to be the most common feature associated with Otx2 mutations.

Otx2 also regulates two other genes, Lhx1 and Dkk1 that also play a role in head morphogenesis. Otx2 is required during early formation of the embryo to initiate the movement of cells towards the anterior region and establish the anterior visceral endoderm. In the absence of Otx2, this movement can be impeded, which can be overcome by the expression of Dkk1, but it does not prevent the embryo from developing head truncation defects. The absence of Otx2 and the enhanced expression of Lhx1 can also lead to severe head truncation.

It has been shown that if Otx2 is over expressed it can lead to childhood malignant brain tumors called medulloblastomas.

Duplication of OTX2 is involved in the pathogenesis of Hemifacial Microsomia.

In the mouse, the lack of Otx2 inhibits the development of the head. These 'knockout' mice that fail to form the head have gastrulation defects and die at midgestation with severe brain anomalies.

Role of Otx2 in Visual Plasticity
Recent research has identified the homeoprotein Otx2 as a possible molecular ‘messenger’ that is necessary for experience-driven visual plasticity during the critical period. Initially involved in embryonic head formation, Otx2 is re-expressed during the critical period of rats (>P23) and regulates the maturation of parvalbumin-expressing GABAergic interneurons (PV-cells), which control the onset of critical period plasticity. Dark-rearing from birth and binocular enucleation of rats resulted in decreased expression of PV-cells and Otx2, which suggests that these proteins are visually experience-driven. Otx2 loss-of-function experiments delayed ocular dominance plasticity by impairing the development of PV-cells. Research into Otx2 and visual plasticity during the critical period is of particular interest to the study of developmental abnormalities such as amblyopia. More research must be conducted to determine if Otx2 could be utilized for therapeutic recovery of visual plasticity to aid some amblyopic patients.

Role in Embryonic Stem Cells Biology 

Otx2 is a key regulator of the earliest stages of ES cell differentiation. The ectopic expression of Otx2 drives ES cells into differentiation, even in the presence of the LIF cytokine. At the molecular level, Otx2 induction partially compensates the gene expression changes induced by Nanog overexpression in the absence of LIF.

References

Further reading

External links 
 
 

Transcription factors